A hydrogen clathrate is a clathrate containing hydrogen in a water lattice.  It is not possible to store commercial quantities of hydrogen by this method hydrogen in a hydrogen economy.  A recent review that accounts the state-of-the-art and future prospects and challenges of hydrogen storage as clathrate hydrates is reported by Veluswamy et al. (2014). Another unusual characteristic is that multiple hydrogen molecules can occur at each cage site in the ice, one of only a very few guest molecule that forms clathrates with this property. The maximum ratio of hydrogen to water is 6 H2 to 17 H2O.  It can be formed at 250K in a diamond anvil at a pressure of 300MPa (3000 Bars).  It takes about 30 minutes to form, so this method is impractical for rapid manufacture.  The percent of weight of hydrogen is 3.77%.  The cage compartments are hexakaidecahedral and hold from two to four molecules of hydrogen.  At temperatures above 160K the molecules rotate around inside the cage.  Below 120K the molecules stop racing around the cage, and below 50K are locked into a fixed position.  This was determined with deuterium in a neutron scattering experiment.

Under higher pressures a 1:1 ratio clathrate can form. It crystallises in a cubic structure, where H2 and H2O are both arranged in a diamond lattice.  It is stable above 2.3 GPa.

Under even higher pressures (over 38 GPa) there is a prediction of the existence of a clathrate with a cubic structure and a 1:2 ratio: 2H2•H2O.

More complex clathrates can occur with hydrogen, water and other molecules such as methane, and tetrahydrofuran.

Since hydrogen and water ice are common constituents of the universe, it is very likely that under the right circumstances natural hydrogen clathrates will be formed.  This could occur in icy moons for example.  Hydrogen clathrate was likely to be formed in the high pressure nebulae that formed the gas giants, but not to have formed in comets.

References

External links

Clathrate hydrates
Energy technology
Natural gas technology
Hydrogen